William Tennent (1673 – May 6, 1746) was an early Scottish American Presbyterian minister and educator in British North America.

Early life
Tennent was born in Mid Calder, Linlithgowshire, Scotland, in 1673. He graduated from the University of Edinburgh in 1695 and was ordained in the Church of Ireland in 1706. He migrated to the Thirteen Colonies in 1718, arriving in the colony of Pennsylvania at the urging of his wife's cousin James Logan, a Scots-Irish Quaker and close friend of William Penn.  In 1726 he was called to a pastorate at the Neshaminy-Warwick Presbyterian Church in present-day Warminster, where he stayed for the remainder of his life.

The Log College
In 1727 Tennent established a religious school in a log cabin that became famous as the Log College. He filled his pupils with evangelical zeal, and a number became revivalist preachers in the First Great Awakening. The educational influence of the Log College was of importance since many of its graduates founded schools along the frontier. Princeton University is regarded as the successor to the Log College.

The name Log College had a negative connotation at the time, as it was a derisive nickname attached to the school by ministers educated in Europe. They chided Tennent for trying to educate poor farm boys considered by some to be unsuitable for the ministry.

Tennent's sons Gilbert (1703-1764) and William, Jr. were also noted early American clergymen. Rev. William Tennent, Jr. was the Presbyterian pastor of the Freehold, New Jersey congregation. A grandson, also the Rev. William Tennent, was known in church history as William Tennent the Third.

Old Tennent Church
The current edifice of the Old Tennent Church in Tennent, New Jersey, completed 1751–53, was named in memory of pastors William Tennent and his brother John Tennent.

Death
Tennent died in Warminster in 1746, and his gravesite can still be found today in the church cemetery of the Neshaminy-Warwick Presbyterian Church.  Tennent's last will and testament is on record at the Bucks County Court House. It indicates that by the time he died he was still a humble servant of God, leaving what little he had to his wife Catherine (née Kennedy) Tennent. It is alleged that Tennent was also a slave owner, although the historical record is inconclusive.

Legacy 
At least one school, William Tennent High School (located close to the location of the Log College) is named for Tennent. Both are public schools within the Centennial School District in Bucks County, Pennsylvania, specifically Warminster, PA.

Inspired by the model of theological education began by Tennent and beginning in 2020, the William Tennent School of Theology was launched in Woodland Park, Colorado. The school currently offers three postgraduate degree programs, a M.A.T.S., a M.Litt., and a M.Div.

Archival collections 
The Presbyterian Historical Society in Philadelphia, Pennsylvania, has a collection of Rev. Tennent's original sermons and notes.

References

External links
Neshaminy-Warwick Presbyterian Church
PDF hosted at the above site summarizing Tennent's life and career
Princeton University History

1673 births
1746 deaths
Scottish emigrants to the Thirteen Colonies
Scottish Presbyterians
18th-century Presbyterian ministers
American religious leaders
Presbyterian Church in the United States of America ministers
History of Christianity in the United States
Alumni of the University of Edinburgh
People from West Lothian
People of colonial Pennsylvania
People from Warminster, Pennsylvania
18th-century American clergy
Burials in Pennsylvania